The book Introduction to Arithmetic (Arithmetike eisagoge) is the only extant work on mathematics by Nicomachus (60–120 AD).

Summary
The work contains both philosophical prose and basic mathematical ideas. Nicomachus refers to Plato quite often, and writes that philosophy can only be possible if one knows enough about mathematics. Nicomachus also describes how natural numbers and basic mathematical ideas are eternal and unchanging, and in an abstract realm. It consists of two books, twenty-three and twenty-nine chapters, respectively.

Although he was preceded by the Babylonians and the Chinese, Nicomachus provided one of the earliest Greco-Roman multiplication tables, whereas the oldest extant Greek multiplication table is found on a wax tablet dated to the 1st century AD (now found in the British Museum).

Influence
The Introduction to Arithmetic of Nicomachus was a standard textbook in Neoplatonic schools and become the basis of the Boethius' treatise titled De institutione musica.

The Arithmetic (in Latin: De Institutione Arithmetica) of Boethius was a Latin paraphrase and a partial translation of the Introduction to Arithmetic.
The work of Boethius on arithmetic and music was exposed in the context of the Quadrivium liberal arts and had a great diffusion during the Middle Age.

Editions
 Nicomachus of Gerasa Introduction to arithmetic, translated into English by Martin Luther D'Ooge; with studies in Greek arithmetic by Frank Egleston Robbins and Louis Charles Karpinski, University of Michigan studies (London: Macmillan, 1926).
 Nicomachus of Gerasa Introduction to arithmetic, translated into English by Martin Luther D'Ooge; with studies in Greek arithmetic by Frank Egleston Robbins and Louis Charles Karpinski (London: Johnson Reprint Corp., 1972).

See also
 Superparticular ratio

References

Bibliography
 Archivistic sources

External links

 Nicomachus' "Introduction to Arithmetic", translated by Martin Luther D'Ooge at archive.org.
 Nicomachus of Gerasa: Introduction to Arithmetic (1926) translated in English by Martin Luther D'Ooge with studies in Greek arithmetic by Frank Egleston Robbins and Louis Charles Karpinski at Haithi Trust Digital Library

Mathematics books